Syndiclis lotungensis is a species of plant in the family Lauraceae. It is found in China (Hainan) and Vietnam.

References

Vulnerable plants
Flora of China
Flora of Vietnam
Taxonomy articles created by Polbot
lotungensis